The Beaufort River is a river in the South West of Western Australia.

The river was named in 1835 by John Septimus Roe, Surveyor General of Western Australia, after a friend Rear Admiral Sir Francis Beaufort who was Hydrographer of the Navy from 1829 to 1855.

The river has its headwaters west of Woodanilling near Melbourne Vale and flows in a westerly direction until it flows into the Arthur River near Duranillin. The Arthur River is a tributary of the Blackwood River.

The only tributary of the river is the  Beaufort River East that joins the main river just east of where it crosses Albany Highway.

The river's catchment falls within the Blackwood catchment's Beaufort zone as part of the Beaufort system. The system is composed of broad valley floors with a grey sandy duplex and was previously a wandoo sheoak woodland but has now mostly been cleared for agriculture.

References

Rivers of the South West region